Port Glasgow railway station is on the Inverclyde Line, serving the town of Port Glasgow, Scotland. It is located in the town centre with the main entrance at the junction of Princes Street and John Wood Street.

It opened on 31 March 1841, being one of the intermediate stations on the Glasgow, Paisley and Greenock Railway which opened on that date.

The two lines diverge to the west of the station, with the Wemyss Bay branch now mostly single track all the way to the terminus; the Gourock line is double throughout.  Both lines were electrified in 1967 by British Rail using the 25 kV AC system, with the branch partially singled as part of the modernisation work.  A (now disused) connection to the former Glasgow and South Western Railway station at Greenock diverged from the branch line a short distance west of the junction.  The old station was used for a period (circa 1971–84) as a container terminal, but was officially closed in September 1991.

There was a bay platform at the west end of the station for services to Wemyss Bay. The platform was located on the south side of the line and is now infilled – prior to electrification, it was used for carriages which were added to (and on return detached from) Wemyss Bay trains.

Services
Port Glasgow is the only station on the Inverclyde Line where all passenger services stop. There are five trains per hour from the station eastbound on weekday & Saturday daytimes to Paisley & Glasgow Central – four originate from Gourock and one from Wemyss Bay. Three of these are limited stop (including that from Wemyss Bay), whilst the others call at all intermediate stations en route. In the evening, there are two trains per hour to Gourock, one to Wemyss Bay and three to Glasgow Central, whilst on Sundays there is a half-hourly service to Glasgow and hourly to both Gourock & Wemyss Bay. Most trains are now operated by  EMUs.

Gallery

References

Sources

External links

Railway stations in Inverclyde
Former Caledonian Railway stations
Railway stations in Great Britain opened in 1841
SPT railway stations
Railway stations served by ScotRail
1841 establishments in Scotland
Port Glasgow